Jan Ghyselinck (born 24 February 1988 in Tielt) is a Belgian former professional road cyclist, who rode professionally between 2010 and 2016 for the , ,  and  teams.

He joined  as a neo-pro for the 2010 season, and after some good results he signed a full-contract with the team. Ghyselinck left  at the end of the 2013 season, and joined  for the 2014 season.

Major results

2005
 1st  Time trial, National Junior Road Championships
 1st Overall Giro della Toscana Juniors
1st Stage 1
 1st Ronde van Vlaanderen Juniors
 1st Stage 4 Sint-Martinusprijs Kontich
2006
 National Junior Road Championships
1st  Time trial
3rd Road race
 1st Bernaudeau Junior
 1st Gent–Menen
 7th Paris–Roubaix Juniors
2007
 1st Stage 1 (ITT) Tour des Pays de Savoie
 2nd Time trial, National Under-23 Road Championships
2008
 1st  Time trial, National Under-23 Road Championships
 3rd Ronde van Vlaanderen U23
 3rd Liège–Bastogne–Liège U23
 6th Grand Prix de Waregem
2009
 1st De Vlaamse Pijl
 1st Ronde van Vlaanderen U23
 3rd Overall Le Triptyque des Monts et Châteaux
1st Stage 2 (ITT)
 3rd Overall Tour de Bretagne
 5th Liège–Bastogne–Liège U23
 9th Time trial, UEC European Under-23 Road Championships
2012
 4th Dwars door Vlaanderen
2013
 10th Binche–Chimay–Binche
2014
 1st Polynormande
 5th Overall Driedaagse van West-Vlaanderen
 8th Overall Tour of Belgium
 10th Overall Four Days of Dunkirk

Grand Tour general classification results timeline

References

External links
Jan Ghyselinck profile at Team HTC-Highroad

1988 births
Living people
Belgian male cyclists
People from Tielt
Cyclists from West Flanders